Madam Koi Koi (Lady Koi Koi, Miss Koi Koi, also known in Ghana as Madam High Heel or Madam Moke and in Tanzania as Miss Konkoko)  is a ghost in Nigerian and African urban legend who haunts dormitories, hallways and toilets in boarding schools at night, while in day schools she haunts toilets and students who come to school too early or leave school late. She is often depicted wearing a pair of red heels or wearing a single heel.

She is one of the most popular boarding school ghosts in Nigeria, Ghana and South Africa.

Etymology 
The name "Madam Koi Koi" is taken from the sound her heels makes whenever she comes to prey on students at night, while in Ghana the name "Madam Moke" is taken from the Ghanaian word for high heels.

Origin 
There are several stories that tell the origin of Madam Koi Koi.

Nigeria  
In Nigeria, she was depicted as a stylish teacher in a secondary school known for her beauty and her red heels. Whenever she walked in the hallways, her shoes would make the sound "Koi Koi", which is where the name "Madam Koi Koi" comes from. It was also said that she was very nasty to students and would beat them up for no reason. She was fired when she slapped a female student and injured her ear. On her journey back home, she was involved in an accident and died. Before she died she swore that she would have her revenge on the school and its students.

Not too long after, students of the secondary school said at night they would hear a "Koi Koi" sound in the hallways of their dormitories after lights out, almost like the clicking of heels on a floor.

In another tale, she was also said to be a very wicked teacher who would flog her students every chance she got. Some said she was a sadist and used being a teacher as an excuse to inflict extreme pain and torture whenever she pleased. Her students, tired of the school management's failure to reprimand her, decided to take matters into their own hands. One night, as she was leaving the school, the students cornered her, gagged her so she wouldn't scream, and began to beat her mercilessly, killing her. After realizing the fact, they threw her body over the school's back fence and ran away in hopes of making witnesses think that the damage was caused by an armed robber.

Gradually, every student except the one who hit her with the shoe disappeared. He constantly told everyone what he and the others had done and that he heard the sound of high heels clacking around his hostel every night, which he believed meant that she was coming for him, but no one believed him. One night, he decided to go find out where the sound was coming from, however, he was beaten to death and his body was found the morning after.

The school was shut down and all the kids were transferred to new schools, these kids later went to spread the legend to their new schools. She walks the halls of hostels at night tormenting students and causing everyone who looks at her to disappear.

In other countries 
Similar characters resembling Madam Koi Koi can be seen in Ghana, Cameroon, South Africa and other African countries.

Activities 
Madam Koi Koi is mainly known for haunting school premises with activities ranging from opening school doors, singing, whistling, attacking people in toilets or the bathroom, or slapping students. Her presence is always accompanied by her footsteps, She may also be invisible save for her heel. In some tales she often disturbs students at night, demanding her heel which is said to be missing.

In popular culture 
Madam Koi Koi is the antagonist in the children's book Feyi Fay and Simisayo Brownstone's The Case of the Mysterious Madam Koi Koi.

See also
 Duppy
 Mami Wata
 Tokoloshe

References

African demons
African ghosts
African mythology
Female legendary creatures
Ghanaian culture
Ghosts in popular culture
Supernatural legends
Urban legends
Witches in folklore